Jean-Baptiste Bessières (6 August 1768 – 1 May 1813), 1st  Duke of Istria (Duc d'Istrie), was a French military commander and Marshal of the Empire who served during both the French Revolutionary Wars and the Napoleonic Wars. His younger brother, Bertrand, followed in his footsteps and eventually became a divisional general. Their cousin, Julien Bessières, also served Emperor Napoleon I as a diplomat and imperial official.

Early life and career
Bessières was born on 6 August 1768 in Prayssac, in the province of Quercy, to a bourgeois family. He was the eldest of eight children born to Mathurin Bessières, a physician, and Antoinette Lemozy. He attended school in the nearby city of Cahors.

In 1792, during the French Revolution, Bessières was called to Paris to serve in the Constitutional Guard of King Louis XVI. Each department was required to send a certain number of young men to supply it, which were selected from families considered as still being loyal to the king. Among others sent by the department of Lot for the Guard were Joachim Murat and Jean-Jacques Ambert.

Despised for its royalist nature, the Constitutional Guard was disbanded by the revolutionary government on 29 May 1792, less than three months after its formation. Like other former officers of the Guard, Bessières took part in the unsuccessful defense of the Tuileries Palace during the Insurrection of 10 August. He was accused afterwards of having collaborated with the Marquis de Mandat, who organized the defenses of the palace but was killed shortly before the insurrection. He therefore went into hiding, and, finding refuge with the Duc de la Rochefoucauld, stayed at his residence for nearly three months.

Revolutionary Wars
Bessières gave a fresh start to his military career in November 1792, when he enlisted in the Revolutionary Army as a simple cavalryman in the 22nd regiment of chasseurs à cheval. The regiment was deployed in the Army of the Eastern Pyrenees, and for the next three years Bessières fought in the War of the Pyrenees against Spain until its end, with his regiment operating in Catalonia and Cerdanya. He was promoted to sub-lieutenant in February 1793.

After several setbacks in 1793, France reversed the situation of the war with Spain with a major victory at the Battle of Boulou, in 1794, with the Army of the Pyrenees under the command of General Jacques Dugommier. During the battle a charge of Bessière's chasseurs regiment was decisive in dispersing the more numerous Spanish cavalry. Next he took part in the Battle of the Black Mountain under the command of General Charles Dugua, and distinguished himself at Bascara in 1795.

In 1796, at the rank of captain, Bessières went to serve in Napoleon Bonaparte's Italian campaign. At Rovereto his conduct brought him to his chief's notice, and after the Battle of Rivoli he was sent to France to deliver the captured colours to the Directory. Hastening back to the front, he accompanied Napoleon in the invasion of Styria in command of the Guides, who formed the nucleus of the later Consular and Imperial Guards.

As a chef de brigade, he then served in the Egyptian expedition and won further distinction at Acre and Abukir. Returning to Europe with Napoleon, Bessières was present at the Battle of Marengo (1800) as second-in-command of the Consular Guard. General Jean Lannes, commanding a corps at Marengo, felt that Bessières didn't support his faltering troops sufficiently, and a long running feud arose between them. At the close of the battle, Bessières led a successful cavalry charge with the Guard Cavalry, though its effect on the battle was not as decisive as Napoleon pretended. It was General François Étienne de Kellermann's cavalry charge that won the battle for Marengo but Napoleon gave the credit largely to his own Guard Cavalry.

Napoleonic Wars

Promoted to general of division in 1802, he was subsequently made a Marshal of the Empire in 1804, a wholly undeserved distinction rewarded due to his loyalty and friendship with Napoleon. General Auguste de Marmont, a future marshal, said that if Bessières could be made a marshal, then anyone could become one as well. He was also made colonel-general of the Guard Cavalry and would command them in all future campaigns where he proved a very able cavalry commander.

In 1805, Bessières was awarded the Grand Eagle of the Legion of Honour, and in 1809 was entitled Duke of Istria. It was a duché grand-fief, a rare, nominal, but hereditary honor (extinguished in 1856) in Napoleon's own Kingdom of Italy.

With the outbreak of the Peninsular War in 1808, Bessières had his first opportunity at independent command. He did well against the Spanish, scoring a crushing victory in the Battle of Medina del Rio Seco, but proved slow and hesitant in command of a large force. Bessières was thus soon recalled to lead the Guard Cavalry during Napoleon's invasion of Spain, a task more befitting his talents.

As war erupted in 1809 against Austria, he was again with the Grande Armée in the Danube valley as a cavalry leader, a position in which he excelled. At the Battle of Aspern-Essling, he led the cavalry in the centre and did well holding it against superior numbers, but once again fell foul of Lannes. Lannes again felt that Bessières was not providing sufficient support to his faltering troops and ordered him to charge home instead of malingering. Bessières then challenged Lannes to a duel, but Marshal André Massena intervened and prevented the duel between the two marshals in front of their troops.

At the subsequent Battle of Wagram, Bessières once again led the cavalry reserve and had a horse killed under him which caused consternation amongst the Guard. Napoleon congratulated him on making his Guard cry but also chided him for not netting more prisoners because he lost his horse.

Replacing Marshal Jean-Baptiste Bernadotte in command of the Army of the North later that same year, the newly created Duke of Istria successfully drove back the British in the Walcheren Campaign. In 1811, he was sent back to Spain again to lead the Army of the North. He mostly fought counterinsurgency operations and proved a difficult and touchy colleague to his fellow army commanders, especially Masséna who was in dire need of support after his failed invasion of Portugal in 1810–1811. He was recalled in some disgrace and once again reverted to his habitual Guard Cavalry post.

For the Russian campaign in 1812, Bessières commanded the enlarged Guard Cavalry. Hardly engaged at the Battle of Borodino, he destroyed his reputation with the rest of the army when he advised Napoleon not to use his Guard for a decisive breakthrough. Although this left the Imperial Guard intact for future battles, it prevented a decisive victory which might have successfully ended the Russian campaign.

With Marshal Joachim Murat back in Naples at the beginning of the 1813 campaign, Bessières was appointed to the command of the whole of Napoleon's cavalry.

Death 
Three days after the opening of the campaign and on the eve of the Battle of Lützen, while conducting a reconnaissance of the defile of Poserna-Rippach, Bessières was killed by a cannonball shot which ricocheted off a wall and hit him in the chest.
He died instantly. Napoleon deeply felt the loss of one of his truest friends while the remaining Marshals considered it a good death for a soldier.

After his death, Bessières was found to be heavily in debt after spending his fortune on his mistress. Napoleon oversaw his inheritance, settled most of his debts, and looked out for the future of his children. His eldest son, Napoléon Bessières, was made a member of the Chamber of Peers by King Louis XVIII.

Legacy 

As a commander, Bessières proved out of his depth when leading armies. His background as the commander of Napoleon's headquarters guard, the Guides of the Army of Italy, deprived him of the wide experience his fellow marshals had earned before assuming high command. Like Murat, he was however an excellent cavalry commander and he also proved an able administrator of the Imperial Guard. His few attempts at independent command were not a success however and Napoleon thereafter preferred using Bessières as a cavalry commander.

Bessières was not of high birth but he adopted the manners and looks of a gentleman as befitting Napoleon's closest Guard commander. He typically wore the uniform of Napoleon's old Guides of the Army of Italy with marshal's distinctions and wore his hair long with white powder in Ancien Régime style, even when the latter went out of fashion. He was known to be well mannered and kind and generous to subordinates but very touchy about his privileges and position.

Notes

References

External links
Heraldica.org – Napoleonic heraldry

1768 births
1813 deaths
Commanders in the French Imperial Guard
Dukes of the First French Empire
French military personnel killed in the Napoleonic Wars
French military personnel of the French Revolutionary Wars
Grand Croix of the Légion d'honneur
Marshals of the First French Empire
Names inscribed under the Arc de Triomphe
People from Lot (department)